The Sun Party (太陽党 Taiyōtō) was a Japanese political party which existed from 1996 to 1998. It was a liberal reformist party that was opposed to the ruling coalition led by the Liberal Democratic Party (Japan).

The party was composed of thirteen Diet members who left the New Frontier Party in 1996. It was led by Tsutomu Hata, a former Prime Minister of Japan. Other notable members included Katsuya Okada, the future head of the Democratic Party of Japan. In January 1998 the Sun Party merged with other small parties to form the Good Governance Party.

Presidents of SP

Defunct political parties in Japan
Political parties established in 1996
Political parties disestablished in 1998
1996 establishments in Japan
1998 disestablishments in Japan